The Dimasa Kachari plains tribe of Cachar are known as Barman, forming one of the indigenous tribes of undivided Cachar (including Dima-Hasao, Hailakandi and Karimganj). The Dimasas, inhabiting in the Cachar district are officially recognized as one of the Scheduled Tribes under the plains category in Assam in the name called “Barmans in Cachar”.

Historical Background
In the sixteenth century, a Koch principality was established in Khaspur over the area wrested from Tripura by Chilarai who made it a “crown colony” of Koch Behar under Uparaja who later declared his independence and formed the Kingdom of Khaspur. However, since the beginning of the eighteenth century this Kingdom was on its decline; its last ruler Bhimsingha was growing old with no male heir. His only daughter Kanchani was given marriage to the Dimasa prince Lakshmi Chandra in 1745 A.D. Shortly after the demise of Bhimsingha, the two states (Maibang and Khaspur) were merged and the capital of Dimasas was shifted from Maibang to Khaspur, near Silchar, the Cachar valley or South Cachar became the core area of the Dimasa state. The North Cachar Hills (present Dima-Hasao) was administered by a Dimasa governor and Central Cachar (Nagaon portion) through an Aditya or Sezwal. Members of the royal family and a large number of the aristocracy moved to the plains Cachar. The aristocracy which settled in Cachar formed a Hindu caste called BARMAN and consecrated as Kshatriya by Brahmanas and allowed to put on sacred threads (Janeo).

Religion

They came close to the mainstream of the Sanatana (aka Hindu) religious life by replacing their many age-old customs and rituals with Sanatana practices, later they were grouped to Kshatriya and referred to as Barman. Even then they retained some of their age old animistic customs and rituals which they still practice. Like most of the indigenous peoples, the animistic perspective is so inherent that they do not even have a word in their language that corresponds to "Animism" (the term, which is an anthropological construct).

Language
The mother tongue of Barmans is Dimasa. From the four major dialects of Dimasa, i,e, Hasao, Hawar, Dembra and Dizuwa  (aka Dijuha), the Barmans speak the Hawar dialect. Linguistically, it comes under Barish (aka Bodo-Garo or Bodo-Koch) section of Baric (aka Sal or Bodo-Konyak-Jinghpaw) division of Tibeto-Burman language family.

Clans
The Barmans of Cachar have 40 patri clans called Sengphong /seŋpoŋ/ and 42 matri clans called Julu /zulu/. Both clans are exogamous in nature apart from the matrimonial relationship.   A male member of Barmans inherits his father's Sengphong and mother's Julu (aka Jilik) but he handed down only the Sengphong to his lineage, not his Julu. Similarly, a female member inherits both the clans from parents but she handed down only one clan, that is, her mother's Julu.

References

Cachar district
Dimasa people
Ethnic groups in Northeast India
Languages of Assam
Sino-Tibetan-speaking people